Shanghai is a color photograph by German photographer Andreas Gursky created in 2000. The photograph has variable large dimensions, with the one held at the Art Institute of Chicago having 306 by 206 cm, and has a six prints edition.

Description
Gursky took aim at hotel lobbies, among other subjects, in the 1990s. The current photograph was created after he took three pictures in the monumental atrium of the Grand Hyatt Hotel in Shanghai, China. He afterwards used digital manipulation of the images taken of the hotel first three floors to achieve the background has having the same resolution as the foreground. The picture tends to abstraction and is impressive in his visual scale of a towering space and the vivid yellow color, in which the floor almost comes out of the viewers angle.

Art market
A print of the photograph was sold by $1,632,230 on 1 July 2015, at Sotheby's, London.

Public collections
There are prints of this photograph at The Art Institute of Chicago, the San Francisco Museum of Modern Art, the Princeton University Art Museum, and the Museo Nacional Centro de Arte Reina Sofía, in Madrid.

References

2000 in art
2000s photographs
Color photographs
Photographs by Andreas Gursky
Photographs of the Art Institute of Chicago
Photographs of the San Francisco Museum of Modern Art
Photographs in the collection of the Museo Nacional Centro de Arte Reina Sofía